This page provides the summaries of the matches of the qualifying rounds for the group stage of the 2011 CAF Champions League.

The schedule for the tournament was released in October 2010, and the draw for all three rounds was held in Cairo on 20 December 2010.

Qualification ties were decided over two legs, with aggregate goals used to determine the winner. If the sides were level on aggregate after the second leg, the away goals rule applied, and if still level, the tie proceeded directly to a penalty shootout (no extra time is played).

Preliminary round
This was a knock-out stage of the 46 teams that did not receive byes to the first round.

First legs: 28–30 January 2011; Second legs: 11–13, 25–27 February and 4–6 March 2011.

 

JC Abidjan won 3–0 on aggregate and advanced to the first round.

Enyimba won 3–0 on aggregate and advanced to the first round.

Aggregate 0–0.  US Bitam won the penalty shootout and advanced to the first round.

MC Alger won 3–1 on aggregate and advanced to the first round.

Interclube advanced to the first round after Township Rollers withdrew.

Djoliba won 4–0 on aggregate and advanced to the first round.

Diaraf won 3–1 on aggregate and advanced to the first round.

ASPAC won 2–1 on aggregate and advanced to the first round.

ASEC Mimosas won 9–0 on aggregate and advanced to the first round.

Aggregate 1–1.  Motor Action won the penalty shootout and advanced to the first round.

Raja Casablanca advanced to the first round after Tourbillon withdrew after the first leg.

Zamalek won 5–0 on aggregate and advanced to the first round.

Club Africain won 6–2 on aggregate and advanced to the first round.

Recreativo Caála won 2–1 on aggregate and advanced to the first round.

Simba won 4–2 on aggregate and advanced to the first round.

Kano Pillars won 3–1 on aggregate and advance to the first round.

Wydad AC won 3–1 on aggregate and advanced to the first round.

ASFA Yennenga won 4–1 on aggregate and advanced to the first round.

Aggregate 3–3. Coton Sport advanced on the away goals rule to the first round.

AS Vita Club won 4–1 on aggregate and advanced to the first round.

Supersport United won 3–2 on aggregate and advanced to the first round.

Young Buffaloes won 4–2 on aggregate and advanced to the first round.

ZESCO United won 4–2 on aggregate and advanced to the first round.

First round
This was a knock-out stage of 32 teams; the 23 teams advancing from the preliminary round, and 9 teams that received byes into this round.

First legs: 18–20 March 2011; Second legs: 1–3 April 2011.

Al-Ittihad advanced to the second round after JC Abidjan withdrew. Tie was scheduled to be played over one leg at a neutral venue (at Bamako, Mali on 3 April 2011) due to the political situations in Côte d'Ivoire and Libya, but match did not take place.

Enyimba won 2–1 on aggregate and advanced to the second round.

Aggregate 4–4. MC Alger advanced on the away goals rule to the second round.

Aggregate 2–2. Interclube won on penalties and advanced to the second round.

Diaraf won 4–1 on aggregate and advanced to the second round.

Espérance ST won 5–2 on aggregate and advanced to the second round.

ASEC Mimosas won on penalties and advanced to the second round. Tie played over one leg due to the political situation in Côte d'Ivoire.

Aggregate 2–2. Raja Casablanca advanced on the away goals rule to the second round.

Second leg abandoned on 90+5 minutes with Zamalek leading 2–1 (Club Africain leading 5–4 on aggregate) when Zamalek fans invaded the pitch.  Club Africain advanced to the second round.

Al-Hilal won 4–1 on aggregate and advanced to the second round.

TP Mazembe won 6–3 on aggregate and advanced to the second round, but were later disqualified for fielding an ineligible player. As a result, Simba played against Moroccan side Wydad AC, which lost to TP Mazembe in the second round, in a play-off for a place in the group stage.

 
Wydad AC won 2–0 on aggregate and advanced to the second round.

ES Sétif won 6–3 on aggregate and advanced to the second round.

Coton Sport won 3–0 on aggregate and advanced to the second round.

Al-Ahly won 2–1 on aggregate and advanced to the second round.

ZESCO United won 7–0 on aggregate and advanced to the second round.

Second round
This was a knock-out stage of the 16 teams that advanced from the first round; winners advanced to the group stage, with the losers advancing to the Confederation Cup play-off round.

First legs: 22–24 April 2011; Second legs 7–8 May 2011.

Enyimba advanced to the group stage. Al-Ittihad advanced to the Confederation Cup play-off round. Tie played over one leg due to the political situation in Libya.

MC Alger won 4–3 on aggregate and advanced to the group stage. Interclube advanced to the Confederation Cup play-off round.

Espérance ST won 6–0 and advanced to the group stage. Diaraf advanced to the Confederation Cup play-off round.

Raja Casablanca won on penalties and advanced to the group stage. ASEC Mimosas advanced to the Confederation Cup play-off round. Tie played over one leg due to the political situation in Côte d'Ivoire. 

Second leg abandoned on 81 minutes with the score at 1–1 (Al-Hilal leading 2–1 on aggregate) when Club Africain fans invaded the pitch.  Al-Hilal advanced to the group stage. Club Africain advanced to the Confederation Cup play-off round.

TP Mazembe won 2–1 on aggregate and advanced to the group stage, but were later disqualified for fielding an ineligible player in the first round. As a result, Wydad AC played against Tanzanian side Simba, which lost to TP Mazembe in the first round, in a play-off for a place in the group stage.

Coton Sport won 4–3 on aggregate and advanced to the group stage. ES Sétif advanced to the Confederation Cup play-off round.

Note: First leg postponed following a request from Coton Sport who had four players in the Cameroon U-20 team playing in the 2011 African Youth Championship in South Africa.

Al-Ahly won 1–0 on aggregate and advanced to the group stage. ZESCO United advanced to the Confederation Cup play-off round.

Special play-off
On 14 May 2011, the CAF announced that TP Mazembe from Congo DR were disqualified from the Champions League group stage following a complaint about the eligibility of TP Mazembe's player Janvier Besala Bokungu from Tanzanian side Simba, which lost to them in the first round. As a result, the Organising Committee decided that a replacement for the group stage would be determined by a play-off match at a neutral venue, between Simba and Moroccan side Wydad AC, which lost to TP Mazembe in the second round.

Wydad AC advanced to the group stage. Simba advanced to the Confederation Cup play-off round.

References

External links
CAF Champions League

Qualifying rounds